This article presents a list of the historical events and publications of Australian literature during 2001.

Major publications

Literary fiction

 Geraldine Brooks – Year of Wonders
 Steven Carroll – The Art of the Engine Driver
 Bryce Courtenay – Four Fires
 Robert Dessaix – Corfu: A Novel
 Garry Disher – Past the Headlands
 Richard Flanagan – Gould's Book of Fish: A Novel in Twelve Fish
 Stephen Gray – The Artist is a Thief
 Marion Halligan – The Fog Garden
 Elizabeth Jolley – An Innocent Gentleman
 Kathy Lette – Nip 'n' Tuck
 Joan London – Gilgamesh
 Tim Winton – Dirt Music
 Arnold Zable – Cafe Scheherazade

Children's and Young Adult fiction

 Graeme Base – The Waterhole
 Garry Disher – Moondyne Kate
 Sonya Hartnett – Forest
 Odo Hirsch – Have Courage, Hazel Green!
 Leigh Hobbs – Horrible Harriet
 Maureen McCarthy – Flash Jack
 Garth Nix – Lirael
 Shaun Tan – The Red Tree
 Margaret Wild – Jinx
 Markus Zusak – When Dogs Cry

Crime

 Bunty Avieson – Apartment 255
 Marshall Browne – Inspector Anders and the Ship of Fools
 Jon Cleary – Yesterday's Shadow
 Peter Corris – Lugarno
 Emma Darcy – Who Killed Angelique?
 Peter Doyle – The Devil's Jump
 Kerry Greenwood – Away with the Fairies
 Gabrielle Lord – Death Delights
 Patricia Shaw – The Dream Seekers

Romance

 Lilian Darcy – The Paramedic's Secret
 Barbara Hannay
 The Pregnancy Discovery
 The Wedding Dare

Science Fiction and Fantasy

 Trudi Canavan – The Magicians' Guild
 Cecilia Dart-Thornton – The Ill-Made Mute
 Sara Douglass – The Wounded Hawk
 Greg Egan – Schild's Ladder
 Jennifer Fallon
 Harshini
 Treason Keep
 Kate Forsyth – The Skull of the World
 Ian Irvine – Geomancer
 Fiona McIntosh – Betrayal
 Sean McMullen – Eyes of the Calculor
 Juliet Marillier – Child of the Prophecy
 Garth Nix – Lirael
 Sean Williams
 The Dark Imbalance with Shane Dix
 The Stone Mage and the Sea

Drama

 Andrew Bovell – Holy Day
 David Brown – Keep Everything You Love
 Nick Enright – Spurboard
 Dorothy Hewett – Nowhere
 Peta Murray – Salt : A Play in Five Helpings
 Joanna Murray-Smith – Bombshells
 John Romeril – Miss Tanaka
 David Williamson
 Charitable Intent
 A Conversation
 Up for Grabs

Poetry

 M. T. C. Cronin – Bestseller
 John Forbes – Collected Poems : 1970–1998
 Peter Goldsworthy – New Selected Poems
 Dorothy Hewett – Halfway Up the Mountain
 John Kinsella – The Hierarchy of Sheep
 Peter Porter – Max is Missing
 Chris Wallace-Crabbe – By and Large
 Alan Wearne – The Lovemakers

Biographies

 Peter Carey – 30 Days in Sydney : A Wildly Distorted Account
 Dawn Fraser – Dawn: One Hell of a Life
 Clive James – Always Unreliable : The Memoirs
 Jacqueline Kent – A Certain Style: Beatrice Davis, a Literary Life
 John Kinsella – Auto
 Roger McDonald – The Tree in Changing Light
 Hilary McPhee – Other People's Words
 Peter Rose – Rose Boys
 Nadia Wheatley – The Life and Myth of Charmian Clift

Non-Fiction

 Diane Armstrong – The Voyage of Their Lives: The Story of the SS Derna and its Passengers
Emily Chantiri – The Money Club
Jill Jolliffe – Cover-Up: The Inside Story of the Balibo Five

Awards and honours

Note: these awards were presented in the year in question.

Lifetime achievement

Fiction

International

National

Children and Young Adult

National

Crime and Mystery

National

Science Fiction

Non-Fiction

Poetry

Drama

Deaths

 25 February – Don Bradman, cricketer and author (born 1908)
 18 September – Amy Witting, novelist (born 1918)
 20 September – Patsy Adam-Smith, writer (born 1924)

Unknown date
 Peter Bladen, poet (born 1922)

See also
 2001 in Australia
 2001 in literature
 2001 in poetry
 List of years in literature
 List of years in Australian literature

References

Note: all references relating to awards can, or should be, found on the relevant award's page.

Australian literature by year
Literature
21st-century Australian literature
2001 in literature